Zichy Land (Zemlya Zichy) is a geographical subgroup of Franz Josef Land, Arkhangelsk Oblast, Russia.
It is formed by the central cluster of large islands in the midst of the archipelago. The islands are separated from each other by narrow sounds that are frozen most of the year, forming a compact whole.

This island group was named after Hungarian Count Ödön Zichy (1811-1894)  who was, beside Count Johann Nepomuk Wilczek, the second highest sponsor for the Austro-Hungarian North Pole Expedition to Franz Josef Land.

Geography
The broad channel to the southwest of Zichy Land is known as Markham Sound or Markham Channel (Proliv Markama), after the British polar explorer Admiral Sir Albert Hastings Markham.

The northernmost point of Zichy Land is Cape Bema on Karl-Alexander Island and its southernmost point is Cape Fiume on Champ Island. The distance between the two comprises .
Cape Armitidzh in Luigi Island is the westernmost point of the subgroup.
The channels separating the islands in the southeastern area of the group are very narrow.

Islands
The individual islands forming the Zemlya Zichy archipelago are (from North to south):

Karl-Alexander Island
Rainer Island
Jackson Island
Payer Island
Greely Island 
Brosch Island (Kuna Island)
Kane Island 
Ziegler Island
Salisbury Island
Wiener Neustadt Island
Luigi Island
Champ Island

See also 
 Geography of Franz Josef Land
 List of islands of Russia

References

External links 
 Islands UNEP
 Historical data & (in Russian)

Archipelagoes of Arkhangelsk Oblast
Archipelagoes of the Arctic Ocean
Islands of Franz Josef Land
Zichy family